= Brickit =

- Developer: Brickit LLC
- Operating system: iOS, Android

Brickit is an app and community that allows people to scan their Lego bricks and view creations that can be built from them. The app was initially released for iOS only, and was still in beta in 2021. It is not affiliated with The Lego Group.

== Features ==
The scanner works using machine learning. Once a creation is detected, the scanner shows exactly where in the pile the needed bricks are to build it, with instructions on how to do so being provided. Fans are able to submit creations on the website. It also offers a subscription plan for users. Another app, Brickit for Classes, also exists for use in classrooms.

== Awards ==
The app was awarded Children & Family Product of the Year at the Golden Kitty Awards in 2021.
